AuSable Chasm Bridge is a historic steel arch bridge with concrete and stone faced approach spans that carries US 9 over the Ausable River at AuSable between Clinton and Essex Counties, New York. It was built in 1932–1933.

It was listed on the National Register of Historic Places in 1999.

See also
 
 
 
 
 List of bridges on the National Register of Historic Places in New York
 National Register of Historic Places listings in Clinton County, New York
 National Register of Historic Places listings in Essex County, New York

References

Road bridges on the National Register of Historic Places in New York (state)
Bridges completed in 1933
Bridges in Clinton County, New York
Bridges in Essex County, New York
National Register of Historic Places in Clinton County, New York
National Register of Historic Places in Essex County, New York
U.S. Route 9
Bridges of the United States Numbered Highway System
Steel bridges in the United States
Open-spandrel deck arch bridges in the United States